To Love Again: The Duets is the eighth studio album by Chris Botti, released on October 18, 2005. It consists of cover versions of pop and jazz standards, except for the title track "To Love Again".

Track listing

Personnel 
 Chris Botti – trumpet (1-13)
 Billy Childs – acoustic piano (1, 3-13), Fender Rhodes (2), arrangements (2, 9, 10, 11), conductor 
 Greg Phillinganes – Fender Rhodes (6), arrangements (6)
 Richard Cottle – Hammond organ (9)
 Heitor Pereira – guitar (2), arrangements (2)
 Anthony Wilson – guitar (3, 4, 6-12)
 Arnie Somogyi – bass (1, 5, 13)
 Christian McBride – bass (2, 4, 8, 11)
 Robert Hurst – bass (3, 6, 7, 9, 10, 12)
 Brian Bromberg – bass (13)
 Billy Kilson – drums (1, 3, 5, 6, 7, 10, 12, 13)
 Vinnie Colaiuta – drums (2, 4, 8, 11)
 Peter Erskine – drums (9)
 Paulinho da Costa – percussion (2)
 Jeremy Lubbock – arrangements (1, 3, 5, 13), conductor
 Gil Goldstein – arrangements (2, 4, 6, 7, 8, 12), conductor
 Isobel Griffiths – orchestra contractor (1-13)
 The London Session Orchestra 2005 – orchestra (1-13)
 Sting – vocals (2)
 Paula Cole – vocals (3)
 Michael Bublé – vocals (4)
 Jill Scott – vocals (6)
 Paul Buchanan – vocals (8)
 Gladys Knight – vocals (9)
 Renee Olstead – vocals (11)
 Rosa Passos – vocals (12)
 Steven Tyler – vocals (13)

Production 
 Producer – Bobby Colomby
 Engineers – Hadyn Bendell, Irecyr Franco, Steve Genewick, Jake Jackson, Kevin Killen, Pablo Munguia, Paul Santo and Al Schmitt.
 Recorded at Capitol Studios (Hollywood, CA); Lamirada Studios (Las Vegas, NV); The Studio (Philadelphia, PA); Pandora's Box (Hanover, MA): Studio 57 (Brasilia, DF); The Warehouse Studio (Vancouver, BC); Air Lyndhurst (London, UK).
 Mixed by Al Schmitt 
 Additional ProTools Editing – Andy Snitzer
 Mastered by Robert Hadley and Doug Sax at The Mastering Lab (Hollywood, California).
 Creative Consultant – Jeff Ayeroff
 Art Direction and Design – Mary Maurer 
 Design Assistant – Michael Lau-Robles
 Photography – Fabrizio Ferri

Charts

Certifications

References

Chris Botti albums
2005 albums
Columbia Records albums
Instrumental albums
Albums produced by Bobby Colomby